Three Studies for George Dyer is a small-format triptych painted by Francis Bacon in 1964. 

The work comprises three portraits of Bacon's lover George Dyer: from left to right, a three-quarter view, a right profile, and a face-on view. It was painted in the first half of 1964, within a year of Bacon first meeting Dyer in late 1963, and was based on photographs of Dyer taken by John Deakin. This is one of five of Dyer in the small format, the others completed in 1963, 1964 (on a pink ground), 1966 and 1969.  

Unlike the four other small-format Dyer triptychs, one of which was painted on a pink ground and the others on a dark ground, this version was painted on a light yellowish ground.  Bacon used heavy structural brushstrokes in a limited palette of red/orange, black, and white, with a touch of blue.  

The painting was included in the Bacon retrospective held at the Grand Palais in Paris: Dyer committed suicide the evening before it opened in 1971.  The triptych was held in a private collection from 1970 until it was sold at Sotheby's in London in June 2014 for £26.7m, including buyer's premium.

Sotheby's sold Francis Bacon's 1966 “Three Studies of George Dyer” for $38.6 million following a single telephone bid placed by a collector on 16 November 2017

References

External links
 Three studies for portrait of George Dyer (on light ground), Sotheby's, 30 June 2014
 Sotheby's London Hits High Notes with £93 Million Sale, artnet.com, 30 June 2014

Paintings by Francis Bacon
1964 paintings